The Basmane-Denizli Regional, officially numbered as B38, is a  long regional rail service operating daily between Basmane station in İzmir and Denizli station in Denizli. Trains are operated by TCDD Taşımacılık with a total journey time of 4 hours and 41 minutes.

Railway services introduced in 2010
2010 establishments in Turkey
Transport in İzmir Province
Transport in Aydın Province
Transport in Denizli Province
Regional rail in Turkey